Acquired language may refer to:

 Language acquisition, the process of acquiring language
 Second language, a language that is learnt after a native language
 Second-language acquisition, the process of acquiring a second language